The Pages is a 2008 novel by Australian novelist Murray Bail.

Plot summary
An Australian bush philosopher, Wesley Antill, dies leaving behind a vast collection of philosophical works.  His will indicates that it should be published so Antill's siblings arrange for Erica, a philosopher, and Sophie, a psychoanalyst, to examine the work and decide if it is actually publishable.

Reviews
 The Guardian
 The New York Times

Awards and nominations
 2009 shortlisted Miles Franklin Literary Award 
 2009 shortlisted Victorian Premier's Literary Awards — The Vance Palmer Prize for Fiction 
 2009 shortlisted Prime Minister's Literary Awards — Fiction

References 

2008 Australian novels
Novels set in New South Wales
Text Publishing books